Konstantin Airich (born 4 November 1978) is a Kazakh-born German heavyweight boxer born in Astana, Kazakhstan and based in Hamburg, Germany.

Airich's first defeat was against Danny Williams in a controversial fight. In the sixth round, Williams landed a number of big shots and was thought to be on the verge of knocking Airich out, when the bell sounded with 1:28 left on the clock. Williams ended the fight in the following round, when Airich's promoter decided to throw in the towel.

His second loss was a majority decision loss to Ondrej Pala on 6 March 2009.

Airich took part in the Prizefighter International Heavyweights tournament held at Alexandra Palace in London on 7 May 2011. After winning his opening bout of the evening against Lucian Bot, Airich was eliminated in the semifinal when he suffered a first-round knockout defeat to eventual runner up Tye Fields.

One month after that defeat, on 17 June 2011 he once again took part in the Bigger's Better VI boxing tournament and won the tournament by defeating every opponent he faced.

After Airich became the vacant IBF Inter-Continental heavyweight titleholder by knocking out German fighter Varol Vekiloglu in round 1, on 9 March 9 2012 he faced Ondrej Pala for the second time to retain his IBF Inter-Continental heavyweight title and for Pala’s WBO European heavyweight title. This time Airich defeated Pala by TKO in round 9.

On 19 May 2012 he faced Odlanier Solis, who was coming back from a defeat and knee injury suffered during his last fight against WBC heavyweight champion Vitali Klitschko a year before. Airich lost the fight by unanimous decision.
 
On 13 September 2014, Airich faced British fighter, and London 2012 Olympic Gold Medalist, Anthony Joshua in an 8-round fight. During the third round, Joshua knocked Airich down and the referee stopped the fight. Airich was the first fighter to go past the second round with Anthony Joshua despite the loss.

Professional boxing record

|-
|align="center" colspan=8|23 Wins (18 knockouts), 18 Losses, 2 Draws 
|-
| align="center" style="border-style: none none solid solid; background: #e3e3e3"|Result
| align="center" style="border-style: none none solid solid; background: #e3e3e3"|Record
| align="center" style="border-style: none none solid solid; background: #e3e3e3"|Opponent
| align="center" style="border-style: none none solid solid; background: #e3e3e3"|Type
| align="center" style="border-style: none none solid solid; background: #e3e3e3"|Round
| align="center" style="border-style: none none solid solid; background: #e3e3e3"|Date
| align="center" style="border-style: none none solid solid; background: #e3e3e3"|Location
| align="center" style="border-style: none none solid solid; background: #e3e3e3"|Notes
|-align=center
|Loss
|23-18-2
|align=left| Krzysztof Zimnoch
|TKO
|4 
|2016-05-28
|align=left| 
|align=left|
|-align=center
|Loss
|23-17-2
|align=left| Sergey Kuzmin
|TKO
|2 
|2016-04-08
|align=left| 
|align=left|
|-align=center
|Win
|23-16-2
|align=left| Robert Filipovic
|MD
|8 
|2016-02-26
|align=left| 
|align=left|
|-align=center
|Loss
|22-16-2
|align=left| Alexander Ustinov
|KO
|5 
|2015-12-12
|align=left| 
|align=left|
|-align=center
|Loss
|22-15-2
|align=left| Andriy Rudenko
|TKO
|5 
|2015-10-31
|align=left| 
|align=left|
|-align=center
|Win
|22-14-2
|align=left| Robert Filipovic
|TKO
|6 
|2015-08-28
|align=left| 
|align=left|
|-align=center
|Loss
|21-14-2
|align=left| Adrian Granat
|TKO
|3 
|2015-08-28
|align=left| 
|align=left|
|-align=center
|Loss
|21-13-2
|align=left| Tom Schwarz
|UD
|8 
|2015-11-07
|align=left| 
|align=left|
|-align=center
|Loss
|21-12-2
|align=left| Mariusz Wach
|TKO
|3 
|2016-06-19
|align=left| 
|align=left|
|-align=center
|Loss
|21-11-2
|align=left| Anthony Joshua
|TKO
|3 
|2014-09-13
|align=left| 
|align=left|
|-align=center
|Loss
|27-10-2
|align=left| Christian Hammer
|UD
|10 
|2014-11-04
|align=left| 
|align=left| 
|-align=center
|Win
|27-9-2
|align=left| Vlasis Apostolakis
|PTS
|3 
|2013-04-19
|align=left| 
|align=left|
|-align=center
|Win
|26-9-2
|align=left| Wieslaw Kwasniewski
|TKO
|1 
|2013-04-19
|align=left| 
|align=left|
|-align=center
|Win
|25-9-2
|align=left| Claudiu George Dinu
|KO
|1 
|2013-04-19
|align=left| 
|align=left|
|-align=center
|Loss
|24-9-2
|align=left| Manuel Charr
|KO
|1
|2012-12-21
|align=left| 
|align=left|
|-align=center
|Loss
|24-8-2
|align=left| Sergej Maslobojev
|UD
|3
|2012-11-16
|align=left| 
|align=left|
|-align=center
|Win
|24-7-2
|align=left| Ionel Osvat
|TKO
|2 
|2012-11-16
|align=left| 
|align=left|
|-align=center
|Loss
|23-7-2
|align=left| Vyacheslav Glazkov
|UD
|10
|2012-09-08
|align=left| 
|align=left|
|-align=center
|Loss
|23-6-2
|align=left| Odlanier Solis
|UD
|12
|2012-05-19
|align=left| 
|align=left|
|-align=center
|Win
|23-5-2
|align=left| Ondrej Pala
|TKO
|9 
|2012-03-09
|align=left| 
|align=left|
|-align=center
|Win
|22-5-2
|align=left| Varol Vekiloglu
|KO
|1 
|2011-10-14
|align=left| 
|align=left|
|-align=center
|Win
|21-5-2
|align=left| Marc Adrian
|PTS
|3
|2011-06-17
|align=left| 
|align=left|
|-align=center
|Win
|20-5-2
|align=left| Oezcan Cetinkaya
|UD
|3
|2011-06-17
|align=left| 
|align=left|
|-align=center
|Win
|19-5-2
|align=left| Samir Kurtagic
|TKO
|3 
|2011-06-17
|align=left| 
|align=left|
|-align=center
|Loss
|18-5-2
|align=left| Tye Fields
|KO
|1 
|2011-05-07
|align=left| 
|align=left|
|-align=center
|Win
|18-4-2
|align=left| Lucian Bot
|UD
|3
|2011-05-07
|align=left| 
|align=left|
|-align=center
|Loss
|17-4-2
|align=left| Ed Monso
|PTS
|3
|2011-04-15
|align=left| 
|align=left|
|-align=center
|Win
|17-3-2
|align=left| Vladimir Zelent
|KO
|2 
|2011-04-15
|align=left| 
|align=left|
|-align=center
|Loss
|16-3-2
|align=left| Gbenga Oloukun
|TKO
|4 
|2010-11-12
|align=left| 
|align=left|
|-align=center
|-align=center
|Win
|16-2-2
|align=left| Serdar Uysal
|TKO
|1 
|2010-09-11
|align=left| 
|align=left|
|-align=center
|Win
|15-2-2
|align=left| Alexander Kahl
|TKO
|2 
|2010-06-04
|align=left| 
|align=left|
|-align=center
|Win
|14-2-2
|align=left| Alexey Varakin
|TKO
|1 
|2010-04-09
|align=left| 
|align=left|
|-align=center
|style="background:#abcdef;"|Draw
|13-2-2
|align=left| Oleksiy Mazikin
|MD
|8
|2010-01-23
|align=left| 
|align=left|
|-align=center
|Win
|13-2-1
|align=left| Cisse Salif
|UD
|8
|2009-10-24
|align=left| 
|align=left|
|-align=center
|Win
|12-2-1
|align=left| Vaclav Cihlar
|KO
|1 
|2009-09-18
|align=left| 
|align=left|
|-align=center
|Loss
|11-2-1
|align=left| Ondrej Pala
|MD
|10
|2009-03-06
|align=left| 
|align=left|
|-align=center
|Win
|11-1-1
|align=left| Furkat Tursunov
|UD
|8
|2008-11-18
|align=left| 
|align=left|
|-align=center
|Win
|10-1-1
|align=left| Vaclav Cihlar
|KO
|1 
|2008-09-27
|align=left| 
|align=left|
|-align=center
|Loss
|9-1-1
|align=left| Danny Williams
|TKO
|7 
|2008-05-30
|align=left| 
|align=left|
|-align=center
|Win
|9-0-1
|align=left| Andriy Oliynyk
|UD
|8
|2008-04-26
|align=left| 
|align=left|
|-align=center
|style="background:#abcdef;"|Draw
|8-0-1
|align=left| Oleksiy Mazikin
|PTS
|8
|2008-03-14
|align=left| 
|align=left|
|-align=center
|Win
|8–0
|align=left| Turhan Altunkaya
|RTD
|2 
|2007-12-23
|align=left| 
|align=left|
|-align=center
|Win
|7–0
|align=left| Raymond Ochieng
|KO
|2 
|2007-09-21
|align=left| 
|align=left|
|-align=center
|Win
|6–0
|align=left| Ergin Solmaz
|TKO
|3 
|2007-07-06
|align=left| 
|align=left|
|-align=center
|Win
|5–0
|align=left| Adnan Serin
|KO
|5 
|2007-06-16
|align=left| 
|align=left|
|-align=center
|Win
|4–0
|align=left| Ergin Solmaz
|TKO
|5 
|2007-04-27
|align=left| 
|align=left|
|-align=center
|Win
|3–0
|align=left| Valeri Meierson
|TKO
|2 
|2007-03-09
|align=left| 
|align=left|
|-align=center
|Win
|2–0
|align=left| Tomas Mrazek
|TKO
|2 
|2007-02-10
|align=left| 
|align=left|
|-align=center
|Win
|1–0
|align=left| Mihaly Farkas
|TKO
|1 
|2007-01-25
|align=left| 
|align=left|
|-align=center

References

External links
 

1978 births
Living people
Sportspeople from Astana
Kazakhstani emigrants to Germany
Kazakhstani people of German descent
German people of Kazakhstani descent
Heavyweight boxers
Prizefighter contestants
German male boxers